Tilicho Lake is a lake located in the Manang district of Nepal,  as the crow flies from the city of Pokhara. Another source lists the elevation of Lake Tilicho as being . According to the Nepali Department of Hydrology & Meteorology (2003), no aquatic organism has been recorded in the lake.

Tilicho Lake is the destination of one of the most popular side hikes of the Annapurna Circuit trek. The hike takes additional 3–4 days. No camping is required, as new lodges have been built between Manang and the lake. The final approach to the lake is done in a day hike from the lodge at Tilicho Base Camp.

Trekkers attempting the Annapurna Circuit route usually cross the watershed between Manang and Kali Gandaki valleys over the 5416 meters high Thorong La pass. The alternate route, skirting Tilicho Lake from the north, has been gaining popularity. This route is more demanding and requires at least one night of camping. There are no teahouses or lodges past the Tilicho Base Camp lodge some kilometers east of the lake and the next village of Thini Gaon in the Kali Gandaki valley. Most groups spend two nights between these places. There are two passes leading to Thini Gaon and Jomsom; Mesokanto La and Tilicho North pass known also as Tilicho "Tourist pass". These routes via Tilicho Lake are more often closed by snow than the higher Thorong La.

Tilicho Lake was the site of one of the highest ever altitude scuba dives. A Russian diving team, consisting of Andrei Andryushin, Denis Bakin, and Maxim Gresko, conducted a scuba dive in the lake in 2000.

Religious Significance 
Hindus believe that Tilicho Lake is the ancient Kak Bhusundi Lake mentioned in the epic Ramayana. The sage Kak Bhusundi is believed to have first told the happenings of Ramayana to Garuda - king of birds, near this lake. The sage took the form of a crow while telling the story to Garuda. Crow translates to Kak in Sanskrit, hence the name Kak Bhusndi for the sage.

Surrounding mountains
The mountains surrounding the lake are Khangsar, Muktinath peak, Nilgiri, and Tilicho.

See also
Gurudongmar Lake
Lake Tsongmo
Licancabur

References

External links
 Photo.

Lakes of Gandaki Province
Lakes of Nepal